Julian Beeston is an English musician, mainly noted for his time in the electronic groups Nitzer Ebb and Cubanate. He has spent time as a remixing engineer working on artists such as Bob Marley and Billy Idol. More recently, he has worked as a composer and producer, making music for TV commercials for companies such as Mitsubishi and Ford and has produced trailers for Universal, Miramax and 20th Century Fox.

Discography

as Shining
Din (1995)
Dinmix (1997)

References

External links

External links 
Personal website

English electronic musicians
Living people
Year of birth missing (living people)
Pigface members
Nitzer Ebb members